Dudi Sela was the defending champion but chose not to defend his title.

Yūichi Sugita won the title after defeating Blaž Kavčič 7–6(8–6), 6–4 in the final.

Seeds

Draw

Finals

Top half

Bottom half

References
Main Draw
Qualifying Draw

Pingshan Open - Men's Singles
Pingshan Open